Ada Augusta Holman (née Kidgell) (3 October 1869 – 3 April 1949) was a journalist and novelist in New South Wales, Australia. However, her writing career was increasingly curtailed after her marriage to politician William Arthur Holman, who was to become Premier of New South Wales.

Early life 
Ada Kidgell was born in Ballarat, Victoria on 3 October 1869, the daughter of journalist Ebenezer Kidgell and his wife Agnes (née Martin). Her father worked on Clunes Guardian, the Hawthorn and Boroondara Standard and in 1895–1902 as sub-editor, The Sunday Times, Sydney. She became a teacher at a private school in Narrandera, New South Wales.

Literary career 
Ada Kidgell was active in debating societies and well-informed about literature and politics. She published short stories and political articles under her own name and a number of pseudonyms including "Marcus Malcom", "Nardoo" and "Myee". She was an active member of the Fellowship of Australian Writers.

Her books included a memoir, Memoirs of a Premier's Wife, travel book My Wander Year, novel Sport of the Gods and two children's books.

Marriage and subsequent career 
On Tuesday 22 January 1901, Ada Kidgell married William Arthur Holman (1871–1934), future Premier of New South Wales, at the Australian Church in Sydney. She visited Britain and the United States with her husband; she described Woodrow Wilson as "stuffy" and "pompous".

Works

Later life 
Ada Holman died in a private hospital in Darling Point, Sydney on 3 April 1949; she was survived by her daughter Dr Portia Holman.

Kidgell Place, in the Canberra suburb of Gilmore, is named in her honour.

References

External links 

  – an interview with Ada Holman.

Australian journalists
1869 births
1949 deaths
Australian women writers
19th-century Australian women
20th-century Australian women